Paraplexippus is a genus of Caribbean jumping spiders that was first described by P. Franganillo B. in 1930.  it contains only two species, found only on the Greater Antilles: P. quadrisignatus and P. sexsignatus. The name is a combination of the Ancient Greek "para", meaning "alongside", and the salticid genus Plexippus.

References

Salticidae genera
Fauna of Cuba
Salticidae
Spiders of the Caribbean
Endemic fauna of Cuba